Village School is a private girls middle school located on East High Street in Charlottesville, Virginia, United States.  It was established in 1995 by two high school teachers; Proal Heartwell and Jamie Knorr.  The school offers grades 5–8 with eighteen or nineteen students in each grade.

References

External links

Schools in Charlottesville, Virginia
Private middle schools in Virginia